Karauria Tiweka Anaru  (2 June 1901 – 30 October 1977), often known as Claude Anaru, was a New Zealand interpreter, law clerk, local politician and community leader. Of Māori descent, he identified with the Te Whānau-ā-Apanui iwi. He was born in Raukokore, Bay of Plenty, New Zealand, on 2 June 1901.

In 1953, Anaru was awarded the Queen Elizabeth II Coronation Medal. In the 1957 Queen's Birthday Honours, he was appointed an Officer of the Order of the British Empire, for services to the Māori people.

References

1901 births
1977 deaths
Deputy mayors of places in New Zealand
Local politicians in New Zealand
Interpreters
New Zealand justices of the peace
New Zealand Officers of the Order of the British Empire
Te Whānau-ā-Apanui people
Māori politicians
People from the Bay of Plenty Region
20th-century translators
20th-century New Zealand politicians